Pejantan Tangguh is music album from Sheila on 7 released in 2004. It contains the singles, "Pejantan Tangguh", "Itu Aku" and "Pemuja Rahasia".

Track listing 
 Pejantan Tangguh
 Itu Aku
 Pemuja Rahasia
 Pilihlah Aku
 Brilliant 3x
 Tanyaku
 Generasi Patah Hati
 Coba Kau Mendekat
 Ketidakwarasan Padaku
 Pendosa
 Jangan Beri Tahu Niah
 Khaylila Song

2004 albums
Sheila on 7 albums